Joe  William Haldeman (born June 9, 1943) is an American science fiction author. He is best known for his novel The Forever War (1974). That novel and other works, including The Hemingway Hoax (1991) and Forever Peace (1997), have won science fiction awards, including the Hugo Award and Nebula Award. He was awarded the SFWA Grand Master for career achievements. In 2012 he was inducted as a member of the Science Fiction Hall of Fame. Many of Haldeman's works, including his debut novel War Year and his second novel The Forever War, were inspired by his experiences in the Vietnam War. Wounded in combat, he struggled to adjust to civilian life after returning home. From 1983 to 2014, he was a professor teaching writing at the Massachusetts Institute of Technology (MIT).

Life 

Haldeman was born in Oklahoma City, Oklahoma. His family traveled and he lived in Puerto Rico, New Orleans, Washington, D.C., Bethesda (Maryland) and Anchorage (Alaska) as a child. He had to repeatedly start classes as a new kid in local schools.

In 1965, Haldeman married Mary Gay Potter, known as Gay Haldeman. He received a Bachelor of Science degree in Physics and Astronomy from the University of Maryland in 1967.

He was immediately drafted into the United States Army, where he served as a combat engineer in the Vietnam War. He was wounded in combat and received a Purple Heart. His wartime experience inspired his first novel War Year. In his later books such as The Hemingway Hoax and Old Twentieth, he continued to explore through fiction the experience of combat soldiers in Vietnam and other wars, during the wars and after return home. In 1975, he received a Master of Fine Arts degree in Creative Writing from the University of Iowa Writers' Workshop.

Haldeman has resided alternately in Gainesville, Florida and Cambridge, Massachusetts. From 1983 until his retirement in 2014, he has been an adjunct professor of writing at the Massachusetts Institute of Technology (MIT). MIT serves as the setting for his 2007 novel, The Accidental Time Machine. Haldeman is also a painter.

In 2009 and 2010, Haldeman was hospitalized for pancreatitis.

Work 
Haldeman's first book was a 122-page novel, War Year, published by Holt, Rinehart and Winston in May 1972. The novel was sold with the help of fellow writer Ben Bova. It was based on his letters home from Vietnam and was marketed as mainstream and Young Adult. His most famous novel is his second, The Forever War (St. Martin's Press, 1974), which was inspired by his Vietnam experiences and originated as his MFA thesis for the Iowa Writers' Workshop. It won the year's "Best Novel" Hugo, Nebula and Locus Awards. He later wrote sequels.

In 1975, two Attar novels were published as Pocket Books paperback originals under the pen name Robert Graham. Haldeman also wrote two of the earliest original novels based on the 1960s Star Trek television series universe, Planet of Judgment (August 1977) and World Without End (February 1979).

In a college creative writing class in 1967, Haldeman wrote the first two SF stories which he (later) sold. "Out of Phase" was published in the September 1969 Galaxy magazine, and "the other worked its way down to a penny-a-word market, Amazing Stories                                                                                                                                                                                                                                                                                                                                                                                                                                                                                                                                                                                                                                                                                                                                                                                                                                                                                                                                                                                                                                                                                                                                                                                                                                                                                                                                                                                                                                                                                                                                                                                                                                                                                                                                                                                                                                                                                                                                                                                                                                                                                                                                                                                                                                                                                                                                                                                                                                                                                                                                                                                                                                                                         and netted me all of $15 – but then years later it was adapted for The Twilight Zone, for fifty times as much. Not bad for a story banged out overnight to meet a class deadline."

Haldeman has written at least one produced Hollywood movie script. The film, a low-budget science fiction film called Robot Jox, was released in 1990. He was not entirely happy with the product, saying "to me it's as if I'd had a child who started out well and then sustained brain damage".

In a 2016 interview, Haldeman said, "Jack of all trades, master of none I think. It's a way to go. Not all writers go that way, but many of them do. On a day-to-day basis I wake up in the morning and I can do anything I feel like doing. I don't say, uh oh, I've gotta get back to that damn novel again. I can always write a poem or something. ... "

Major awards 
The Science Fiction Writers of America officers and past presidents selected Haldeman as the 27th SFWA Grand Master in 2009, and he received the corresponding Damon Knight Memorial Grand Master Award for lifetime  achievement as a writer during Nebula Awards weekend in 2010. The Science Fiction Hall of Fame inducted him in June 2012.

He has also won numerous annual awards for particular works.

He is a lifetime member of the Science Fiction and Fantasy Writers of America (SFWA), and past-president.

His filk song "The Ballad of Stan Long (a sexist epic)" received a Pegasus Award in 2005.

He received the Inkpot Award in 1991.

Hugo Award 
 "Hero" (1972) – novella
 The Forever War (1976) – novel
 "Tricentennial" (1977) – short story
 The Hemingway Hoax (1991) – novella
 None So Blind (1995) – short story
 Forever Peace (1998) – novel
 "Four Short Novels" (2003) – short story

John W. Campbell Memorial Award for Best Science Fiction Novel 
 Forever Peace (1998)

Nebula Award 
 The Forever War (1975) – novel
 The Hemingway Hoax (1990) – novella
 "Graves" (1993) – short story
 Forever Peace (1998) – novel
 Camouflage (2004) – novel

Locus Award 
 The Forever War (1976) – SF novel

Rhysling Award 
 "Saul's Death" (1984) – long poem
 "Eighteen Years Old, October Eleventh" (1991) – short poem
 "January Fires" (2001) – long poem

World Fantasy Award 
 "Graves" (1993) – Short Fiction

James Tiptree, Jr. Award 
 Camouflage (2004)

Pegasus Award 
 "The Ballad of Stan Long (a sexist epic)" (2005) – Best Space Opera Song

Bibliography

Non-series
 War Year (1972) – nongenre Vietnam War novel, hardcover and paperback endings differ
 Mindbridge (1976) – Hugo nominee, placed second in annual Locus Poll
 All My Sins Remembered (1977)
 There is No Darkness (1983) – cowritten with Jack C. Haldeman II
 Tool of the Trade (1987)
 Buying Time (1989) – published in the UK as The Long Habit of Living
 The Hemingway Hoax (1990)
 1968 (1994) (novel) – Vietnam War novel
 The Coming (2000) – Locus SF nominee, 2001
 Guardian (2002)
 Camouflage (2004) – Nebula Award winner, 2005
 Old Twentieth (2005)
 The Accidental Time Machine (2007) – Nebula Award nominee, 2007; placed fifth in annual Locus Poll
 Work Done For Hire (2014)

Forever War series
 The Forever War (1974) (Nebula Award winner, 1975; Hugo and Locus SF Awards winner, 1976)
 "A Separate War" (1999, short story; appeared first in 1999 in the anthology Far Horizons; collected in 2006 in War Stories and A Separate War and Other Stories) (The story of Marygay Potter after she parts with William Mandella in The Forever War)
 Forever Free (1999) (a direct sequel to the first novel)

Attar (the Merman) series
 Attar's Revenge (1975) (published under the pseudonym Robert Graham)
 War of Nerves (1975) (published under the pseudonym Robert Graham)

Star Trek novels 
 Planet of Judgment (1977)
 World Without End (1979)

Worlds series 
 Worlds (1981)
 Worlds Apart (1983)
 Worlds Enough and Time (1992)

Forever Peace series
 Forever Peace (1997) (Nebula Award winner, 1998; John W. Campbell Memorial Award for Best Science Fiction Novel winner, 1998; Hugo Awards winner, 1998) (while thematically linked to Haldeman's The Forever War series, Forever Peace is not set in the same universe)
 "Forever Bound" (2010, short story; appears in the anthology Warriors) (a prequel to Forever Peace, it tells the story of Julian Class being drafted and trained as a soldierboy while falling in love with Carolyn)

Marsbound trilogy
 Marsbound (2008) (also serialized in Analog Science Fiction and Fact) – placed fifth in annual Locus Poll)
 Starbound (2010)
 Earthbound (2011)

Short fiction collection
 Infinite Dreams (1978)
 Dealing in Futures (1985)
 Vietnam and Other Alien Worlds (1993)
 None So Blind (1996)
 A Separate War and Other Stories (2006)
 The Best of Joe Haldeman (2013)

Anthologies edited
 Cosmic Laughter (1974)
 Study War No More (1977)
 Nebula Award Stories Seventeen (1983)
 Body Armor: 2000 (1986) (with Charles G. Waugh and Martin H. Greenberg)
 Supertanks (1987) (with Charles G. Waugh and Martin H. Greenberg)
 Space-Fighters (1988) (with Charles G. Waugh and Martin H. Greenberg)
 Future Weapons of War (2007) (with Martin H. Greenberg)

Comics
 The Forever War drawn by Mark van Oppen (better known as Marvano) (original edition La Guerre éternelle (1988–1989))
 Forever Free drawn Marvano (original edition Libre à jamais (2002))
 Dallas Barr drawn by Marvano based on Buying Time (1996–2005)

Poetry
Collections
 
List of poems

See also

References

External links

 
 "Autobiographical Ramble", 16,600 words
 Daily diary on sff.net
 Blog on LiveJournal
  at the Science Fiction and Fantasy Hall of Fame (archived 2013-05-10) 
 
 
 Complete list of sci-fi award wins and nominations by novel
 Review of War Stories
 Joe Haldeman at Fantastic Fiction
 
 Robert Graham at LC Authorities (no records)

Interviews
  as part of the Authors@Google series (2007)
 Interview conducted by Roger Deforest (2006)
 The Craft of Science Fiction hosted by MIT Communications Forum (2006)
 All of Joe Haldeman's audio interviews on the podcast The Future And You (in which he describes his expectations of the future)

1943 births
Living people
20th-century American male writers
20th-century American novelists
21st-century American male writers
21st-century American novelists
American male novelists
American science fiction writers
Analog Science Fiction and Fact people
Asimov's Science Fiction people
Bethesda-Chevy Chase High School alumni
Filkers
Hugo Award-winning writers
Iowa Writers' Workshop alumni
MIT School of Humanities, Arts, and Social Sciences faculty
Military science fiction writers
Nebula Award winners
Novelists from Florida
Novelists from Massachusetts
Novelists from Oklahoma
Rhysling Award for Best Long Poem winners
Rhysling Award for Best Short Poem winners
SFWA Grand Masters
Science Fiction Hall of Fame inductees
United States Army personnel of the Vietnam War
United States Army soldiers
University of Maryland, College Park alumni
World Fantasy Award-winning writers
Writers from Gainesville, Florida
Writers from Oklahoma City
Inkpot Award winners